The Nová doba (New Times) Estate is a residential complex at Vajnorská Street in Bratislava, Slovakia. It was built in 1932 according to the plans of architects Fridrich Weinwurm (1885–1942) and Ignác Vécsei (1883–1944). The complex is an excellent example of the new urban, technical and economic approach being taken to solve the social housing problems. The work is connected with the socialist concept of the minimum dwelling (Karel Teige, 1932) and is also close to the ideas of functionalism.

External links
 Štefan Šlachta: Obytná skupina Nová doba v Bratislave (Slovak only)
 The map

References

Buildings and structures in Bratislava
Houses completed in 1932
20th-century architecture in Slovakia
Buildings and structures completed in 1932
Modernist architecture in Slovakia
Weinwurm-Vécsei buildings
1932 establishments in Czechoslovakia